Northampton Golf Club is a golf club and course in Harlestone, to the northwest of Northampton and immediately to the southeast of Althorp, in Northamptonshire, England. The club was established on 1 July 1893. Three of the holes, the 16th to the 18th, are set around Harlestone Lake.

References

Bibliography

External links
Official site

Golf clubs and courses in Northamptonshire
1893 establishments in England